Ruben Henriques Jr. (1771–1846) was a Danish banker.  He founded the brokerage firm  R. Henriques jr.  in 1801.

Early life and career

Ruben Henriques Jr. was born into the Jewish Henriques family in 1771 in Copenhagen, the son of Bendix Moses Henriques and Elischewa Chawa Henriques. He founded the brokerage firm  R. Henriques jr.  in 1801. It grew and Henriques became one of the richest men in Copenhagen. The company was based in a building on Amagertorv.

Family
Ruben Henriques Jr. married twice. His first wife was Frederikke Rée and his second wife was Jeruchim-Jorika Henriques. He had a total of 18 children. Two of his sons, Aron and Martin Henriques, took over the company in 1852. Sally Henriques,  Samuel Henriques and Nathan Henriques, were all painters. His granddaughter Marie Henriques, the youngest daughter of Martin Henrigues, was also a painter.

His daughter Dorothea Melchior née Henriques was a close friend of Hans Christian Andersen.

References

External links

 Ruben HJenriques at Geni

19th-century Danish businesspeople
Danish bankers
Danish companies established in 1801
Financial services companies established in 1801
Businesspeople from Copenhagen
1771 births
1846 deaths